Échenevex is a commune in the Ain department in eastern France.

Geography
Échenevex is located between the Jura mountains and the Lake Geneva region.  It is situated on the slopes of the Jura mountains, just 3 km south of Gex. The Large Hadron Collider passes under Échenevex, about 100 m below the surface. Echenevex consists partly of the Jura mountains natural park area and is approximately 8 minutes from the Crozet Telecabine ski station, and 15 minutes from Geneva International Airport.

Population

Gallery

See also
Communes of the Ain department

References

Communes of Ain
Ain communes articles needing translation from French Wikipedia